The China women's national under-18 volleyball team represents China in women's under-18 volleyball events, it is controlled and managed by the Chinese Volleyball Association that is a member of Asian volleyball body Asian Volleyball Confederation (AVC) and the international volleyball body government the Fédération Internationale de Volleyball (FIVB).

Results

Summer Youth Olympics
 Champions   Runners up   Third place   Fourth place

FIVB U18 World Championship
 Champions   Runners up   Third place   Fourth place

Team

Current squad

The following is the Chinese roster in the 2017 FIVB Girls' U18 World Championship.

Head coach: Xu Jiande

Notable players
 Yuan Xinyue (2012–2013)
 Gong Xiangyu (2012–2013) as a setter
 Li Yingying (2014–2015)

References

External links
Official website
FIVB profile

Volleyball
National women's under-18 volleyball teams
Volleyball in China